Qingsongite  is a rare boron nitride mineral with cubic crystalline form. It was first described in 2009 for an occurrence as minute inclusions within chromite deposits in the Luobusa ophiolite in the Shannan Prefecture, Tibet Autonomous Region, China. It was recognized as a mineral in August 2013 by the International Mineralogical Association. It is named after Chinese geologist Qingsong Fang (1939–2010). Qingsongite is the only known boron mineral that is formed deep in the Earth's mantle. Associated minerals or phases include osbornite (titanium nitride), coesite, kyanite and amorphous carbon.

References

Native element minerals
Cubic minerals
Minerals in space group 216